Bellary City Assembly seat is one of the seats in Karnataka State Assembly in India. It is part of Bellary Lok Sabha seat.
The constituency includes 28 Wards of Ballari Mahanagara Palika. The constituency came into existence after 2008 Delimitation. It was a part of Bellary (AS).

Geographical scope
The constituency comprises ward nos. 1-24 and 36-39 wards of Ballari Municipal Corporation. 
Urban voters at Bellary City assembly is approximately 242,170 which is around 99.78% as per 2011 Census.

Members of Legislative Assembly

Election results

2008 Assembly Election
 Gali Somashekar Reddy (BJP) : 54,831 votes   
 Anil H.Lad (INC) : 53809

2018 Assembly Election
 G. Somasekhara Reddy (BJP) : 76,589 votes  
 Anil H.Lad (INC) : 60,434

See also 
 List of constituencies of Karnataka Legislative Assembly

References 

Assembly constituencies of Karnataka
Bellary